John William Duncan (1885-1963) was a Welsh international field hockey player.

Education
He was born in 1885 in Cardiff, son of John Thomas Duncan of Llandaff. He was educated at Chard School, Somerset before arriving at Abingdon School, in January 1900, where he stayed until 1903. He excelled at sport and was part of the first XI cricket team during 1901, 1902 and 1903 and the football team. His brother Norman Duncan was Captain of the School in 1906 and a President of the OA Club.

Career
After school John became a ship owner and broker, in the family business based in Llandaf. He later became Chairman for JT Duncan and Company.

Field hockey
He represented Wales at field hockey during 1909, 1910 and 1911.

See also
 List of Old Abingdonians

References

1885 births
1963 deaths
People educated at Abingdon School
Welsh male field hockey players